Degefa is an Ethiopian surname.  Notable people with the surname include:

 Hilina Berhanu Degefa (born 1992), Ethiopian women's rights activist
 Worknesh Degefa (born 1990), Ethiopian long-distance runner, Boston Marathon champion

Surnames of African origin